The 1963–64 SM-sarja season was the 33rd season of the SM-sarja, the top level of ice hockey in Finland. 10 teams participated in the league, and Tappara Tampere won the championship.

Regular season

Final 
 Tappara Tampere - Koo-Vee Tampere 5:3

External links 
 Season on hockeyarchives.info

Fin
Liiga seasons
1963–64 in Finnish ice hockey